Richard G. Buckingham (September 14, 1816 – March 20, 1889) was an American politician who served as the mayor of Denver, Colorado from 1876 to 1877.

Buckingham attended Berkshire Medical College in Pittsfield, Massachusetts and received his MD in 1836. He operated a private practice in Lexington, Missouri for 21 years and then moved the practice to Denver, Colorado.

He was one of the founders of the Denver Medical Association in 1871. The same year, the Colorado Territorial Medical Society was founded and Buckingham was its first president. He advocated for the creation of what was originally named the Colorado Institute for the Education of Mutes.

Buckingham was nominated for governor under the Greenback Party in 1878, but was defeated by Frederick W. Pitkin.

References

Further reading
 

Mayors of Denver
1816 births
1889 deaths
19th-century American politicians
Physicians from Colorado